James Brophy (May 20, 1846 – August 7, 1929) was a Private in the United States Army who received the Medal of Honor for his actions during the Indian Wars.

Early life
Brophy was born on May 20, 1846, in Kilkenny, Ireland, and according to Ellis Island records, he immigrated to the US on January 1, 1864, on board the Albert Gallatin. Brophy enlisted in the Army and was deployed to the Arizona Territory with Company B of the 8th US Cavalry, where he displayed actions as a Private that would later earn him the Medal of Honor. The citation reads:

Medal of Honor
Rank and organization: Private, Company B, 8th US Cavalry. Place and date: Near The Black Mountains, Arizona Territory, August 13, 1868. Birth: Kilkenny, Ireland. Date of issue: July 24, 1869.

Citation:
Bravery in scouts and actions against Indians

Later life
It is possible that Brophy took part in the same actions as Heinrich Bertram, since they both received the Medal of Honor on July 24, 1869, and were both in the vicinity of the Black Mountains. Brophy had one son with a woman named Elizabeth Lampshire, but it is not clear if the two were ever married. James Brophy died August 7, 1929, at the age of 83 in Washington. D.C. He is buried in the US Soldiers’ and Airmen's Home National Cemetery in Washington, D.C.

See also
 List of Medal of Honor recipients
 List of Medal of Honor recipients for the Indian Wars

References

1846 births
1929 deaths
American Indian Wars recipients of the Medal of Honor
19th-century American military personnel